William C. Tourtelot Jr (born in 1970), better known as Billy Tourtelot (pronounced "Doush") is the singer, guitar player and frontman for the St. Petersburg, Florida heavy metal and industrial band Hell on Earth.

Tourtelot is famous for accepting a terminally ill fan's request to die onstage in 2003, a decision that prompted a legal battle with the city of St. Petersburg.

Billy is the son of one of St. Petersburg's best known real estate agents William C. Tourtelot Sr. and Stephanie Tourtelot. His brother Stephen Tourtelot has a lengthy criminal history.

On November 3, 2003, Billy also ran as a write-in candidate for city councillor in District 3 of St. Petersburg against incumbent Bill Foster.

References

American rock singers
American male guitarists
Living people
Singers from Florida
1970 births
Guitarists from Florida
21st-century American singers
21st-century American guitarists
21st-century American male singers